

Measures of the National Assembly for Wales

|-
| {{|Local Government (Wales) Measure 2009|cyshort=Mesur Llywodraeth Leol (Cymru) 2009|nawm|2|10-06-2009|maintained=y|url=mesur-llywodraeth-leol-cymru-local-government-wales-measure|A Measure of the National Assembly for Wales to make provision about arrangements by local authorities and other authorities in Wales to secure continuous improvement in the exercise of their functions; to make provision for community strategies; and for connected purposes.|cylong=Mesur gan Gynulliad Cenedlaethol Cymru i wneud darpariaeth ynglŷn â threfniadau gan awdurdodau lleol ac awdurdodau eraill yng Nghymru i sicrhau gwelliant parhaus wrth arfer eu swyddogaethau; i wneud darpariaeth ar gyfer strategaethau cymunedol; ac at ddibenion cysylltiedig.}}
|-
| {{|Healthy Eating in Schools (Wales) Measure 2009|cyshort=Mesur Bwyta'n Iach mewn Ysgolion (Cymru) 2009|nawm|3|15-10-2009|maintained=y|url=y-mesur-bwytan-iach-mewn-ysgolion-cymru-healthy-eating-in-schools-wales-measure|A Measure of the National Assembly for Wales to make provision about the promotion of healthy eating and drinking by pupils in maintained schools in Wales; to provide for the regulation of food and drink provided to pupils in maintained schools by the governing bodies of those schools or local authorities; and for connected purposes.|cylong=Mesur gan Gynulliad Cenedlaethol Cymru i wneud darpariaeth ynghylch hybu disgyblion mewn ysgolion a gynhelir yng Nghymru i fwyta ac yfed yn iach; i ddarparu ar gyfer rheoleiddio gan gyrff llywodraethu'r ysgolion hynny neu awdurdodau lleol fwyd a diod a ddarperir ar gyfer disgyblion mewn ysgolion a gynhelir; ac at ddibenion sy'n gysylltiedig â hynny.}}
|-
| {{|National Assembly for Wales Commissioner for Standards Measure 2009|cyshort=Mesur Comisiynydd Safonau Cynulliad Cenedlaethol Cymru 2009|nawm|4|09-12-2009|maintained=y|url=mesur-comisiynydd-safonau-cynulliad-cenedlaethol-cymru-national-assembly-for-wales-commissioner-for-standards-measure|A Measure of the National Assembly for Wales to establish a Commissioner to investigate complaints about the conduct of Assembly Members and to report to the Assembly on the outcome of such investigation; and for connected purposes.|cylong=Mesur gan Gynulliad Cenedlaethol Cymru i sefydlu Comisiynydd i ymchwilio i gwynion am ymddygiad Aelodau Cynulliad ac i gyflwyno adroddiadau i'r Cynulliad ar ganlyniad ymchwiliadau o'r fath; ac at ddibenion sy'n gysylltiedig â hynny.}}
|-
| {{|Education (Wales) Measure 2009|cyshort=Mesur Addysg (Cymru) 2009|nawm|5|09-12-2009|maintained=y|url=mesur-addysg-cymru-education-wales-measure|A Measure of the National Assembly for Wales to make provision for children to have a right of appeal in respect of special educational needs, and a right to make a claim in respect of disability discrimination in schools, to the Special Educational Needs Tribunal for Wales; to make provision for the following in relation to special educational needs and disability discrimination in schools: advice and information services, arrangements for dispute resolution other than by appeals and claims to the Special Educational Needs Tribunal for Wales, and independent advocacy services; to make provision for piloting of the provisions of Part 1 of this Measure; to make provision about the curriculum in schools in Wales; and for connected purposes.|cylong=Mesur gan Gynulliad Cenedlaethol Cymru i wneud darpariaeth i blant gael hawl i apelio mewn cysylltiad ag anghenion addysgol arbennig, a hawl i wneud hawliad mewn cysylltiad â gwahaniaethu ar sail anabledd mewn ysgolion, i Dribiwnlys Anghenion Addysgol Arbennig Cymru; i wneud darpariaeth ar gyfer y canlynol mewn perthynas ag anghenion addysgol arbennig a gwahaniaethu ar sail anabledd mewn ysgolion: gwasanaethau cynghori a rhoi gwybodaeth, trefniadau ar gyfer datrys anghydfodau ac eithrio drwy apelau a hawliadau i Dribiwnlys Anghenion Addysgol Arbennig Cymru, a gwasanaethau eirioli annibynnol; i wneud darpariaeth ar gyfer treialu darpariaethau Rhan 1 o'r Mesur hwn; i wneud darpariaeth ynghylch y cwricwlwm mewn ysgolion yng Nghymru; ac at ddibenion cysylltiedig.}}
}}

References

Wales law-related lists